Fatal Fury, known as  in Japan, is a fighting game series developed by SNK for the Neo Geo system.

Games

Canon 
 Fatal Fury – The first game of the Fatal Fury series allowed players to select one of three characters, Terry Bogard, Andy Bogard, and Joe Higashi, as they fight against eight computer-controlled opponents, ending with Billy Kane and Geese Howard. When a second player joins in, they have the option of either playing cooperatively with the other player against the CPU or competitively against each other. The game was ported to SNES and Sega Genesis by Takara. The Neo-Geo version was released onto the Wii's Virtual Console. It was also released as part of SNK Arcade Classics Volume 1 for PS2, PSP, and Wii.
 Fatal Fury 2 – The immediate sequel revamped the controls from the original game, adding punch and kick buttons of different strength levels and allowing the player to change between fighting lanes at will. Terry, Andy, and Joe return, along with five new playable characters (including Mai Shiranui and Kim Kaphwan). This time, the player faces off against the other seven characters (as well as a clone of their own character) before fighting against four computer-only bosses, culminating with the new antagonist Wolfgang Krauser. The game was ported once again to the SNES and Genesis by Takara. A PC Engine Super CD-ROM² was also released by Hudson Soft in Japan, which utilized the Arcade Card.
 Fatal Fury Special – An updated and refined version of Fatal Fury 2, including faster game speed. The roster of twelve characters from Fatal Fury 2 returned, with the four CPU boss characters now playable, along with three returning characters from the original Fatal Fury (Duck King, Tung Fu Rue, and Geese Howard). Ryo Sakazaki from Art of Fighting appears as a secret final boss. The game was once again ported to the SNES by Takara, with a Sega CD version by JVC, and a PC Engine version by Hudson Soft (once again utilizing the Arcade Card). The game was also released for the Xbox Live Arcade service.
 Fatal Fury 3: Road to the Final Victory – Fatal Fury 3 revamps the previous lane changing system and introduces a new type of combo techniques known as "Combination Arts". Terry, Andy, Joe, Mai, and Geese return from Fatal Fury Special, along with five new playable characters (including Blue Mary), along with three boss characters (Ryuji Yamazaki, Jin Chonshu, and Jin Chonrei), for a total of thirteen playable characters. It was ported by SNK to the Sega Saturn. A Windows 95 version was also released by Cyberfront.
 Real Bout Fatal Fury – Real Bout Fatal Fury simplifies the controls and introduces a "Power Gauge" allowing the player to perform super-powered special moves. The Fatal Fury 3 character roster returned (with the boss characters now being regular characters), along with Duck King, Kim Kaphwan, and Billy Kane from Fatal Fury Special. Geese Howard reclaimed his status from the first game as the final boss. This game was also released for the PlayStation (in Japan and Europe) and the Sega Saturn (in Japan only).
 Real Bout Fatal Fury Special – Like Fatal Fury Special, Real Bout Fatal Fury Special retained many of the characters from the classic Fatal Fury games; Cheng Sinzan, Laurence Blood, Tung Fu Rue, and Wolfgang Krauser return from Fatal Fury Special. All sixteen of the characters from Real Bout Fatal Fury return, with Geese Howard now being a secret final boss and hidden playable character. "Extra" versions of Andy Bogard, Tung Fu Rue, Blue Mary, and Billy Kane also appear as secret characters. It was also released for the Sega Saturn in Japan only. Iori Yagami from The King of Fighters series is also a playable character on the Game Boy version of this game.
 Real Bout Garou Densetsu Special: Dominated Mind – A PlayStation game based on Real Bout Special, it features a new story mode starring Alfred (from Real Bout 2) as the main protagonist, and includes a new main antagonist named White, based upon Alexander de Large from the movie A Clockwork Orange. Dominated Mind discards the multi-lane system from the previous Fatal Fury games and introduces new moves such as hidden unlockable super moves and super cancel moves (known in the game as "Final Impacts").
 Real Bout Fatal Fury 2: The Newcomers – The final game in the Real Bout sub-series, Real Bout Fatal Fury 2 retains twenty of the characters from Real Bout Special and introduces two new characters; Li Xiangfei and Rick Strowd. The game also featured a new secret challenger named Alfred.
 Fatal Fury: First Contact – A portable fighting game loosely based on Real Bout 2. It featured the exclusive character Lao, playable only in the two-player versus mode, along with twelve of the characters from Real Bout 2.
 Garou: Mark of the Wolves – The last Fatal Fury game released for the Neo Geo. Set a decade after Real Bout Special, Terry Bogard returns along with a new cast of characters, including new protagonist Rock Howard, Geese's son and Terry's protégé, for a total of fourteen playable characters. The lane-change system was discarded in favor of techniques such as "Just Defend". It was ported to the Dreamcast (released under the title Fatal Fury: Mark of the Wolves) and PlayStation 2 (in Japan only). During the fan event 2005 KOF-party, illustrator Falcoon mentioned that the game's sequel was around 70% percent complete by the SNK team.

Non-Canon 
 Fatal Fury: Wild Ambition – A 3D fighting game that retells the story of Fatal Fury, but with many of the original characters replaced with characters from the later sequels such as Mai, Kim, and Yamazaki, as well as introducing two new characters (Tsugumi Sendo and Toji Sakata). The PlayStation port of Wild Ambition featured an older Ryo Sakazaki as the new Mr. Karate (from Buriki One) and Duck King as secret characters.

Compilations 
Two compilations have been released:
 Fatal Fury Battle Archives Volume 1 (PlayStation 2, SNK Playmore, 2006). The compilation contains original versions of Fatal Fury, Fatal Fury 2, Fatal Fury Special and Fatal Fury 3. It has a language option for each game between Japanese and English. It was released in the United States in August 2007.
 Fatal Fury Battle Archives Volume 2 (PlayStation 2, SNK Playmore, 2007). This compilation contains Real Bout Fatal Fury, Real Bout Fatal Fury Special and Real Bout Fatal Fury 2: The Newcomers. The language option offers Japanese, English, Spanish and Portuguese. It was released in the United States in April 2008.

Gameplay 
The original Fatal Fury is known for the two-plane system. Characters fight from two different planes. By stepping between the planes, attacks can be dodged with ease. Later games have dropped the two-plane system, replacing it with a complex system of dodging, including simple half second dodges into the background and a three plane system. Characters have moves that can attack across the two planes, attack both planes at once, or otherwise attack dodge characters.

Later Fatal Fury games have experimented with various mechanical changes. "Ring-outs" allow a character to lose the round if the character is thrown into the edges of the fighting backdrop; single-plane backdrops, where dodging is eliminated altogether, causing moves that send opponents to the opposite plane to do collateral damage. The "Deadly Rave" is a super combo used by several characters, where after execution, a player had to press a preset series of buttons with exact timing for the entire combo to execute. The "Just Defend" is a type of protected block in which players regained lost life, did not wear down the player's guard crush meter and removed all block stuns making combo interruptions smoother.

Plot

Setting 
Fatal Fury and its sister series, Art of Fighting, are set in the same fictional universe. Art of Fighting took place several years prior to the first Fatal Fury (this is established in Art of Fighting 2, which features a younger long-haired Geese Howard as the game's secret final boss and the true mastermind behind the events of the first Art of Fighting). The two series are set primarily in the same fictional city of "South Town".

Fatal Fury: Wild Ambition likewise features the cast from the series that are featured in The King of Fighters (KOF) series, with many of the more popular characters from Fatal Fury and Art of Fighting games transferred to The King of Fighters as they were introduced. The KOF series ignores the continuity established in the Fatal Fury/Art of Fighting games. This was done so that the characters from both series could be featured in the KOF games without having to age them.

Characters 

As with most fighting games, the Fatal Fury series has an extensive cast of characters that increased with each installment. The three main heroes from the original game, Terry Bogard, Andy Bogard and Joe Higashi, appeared in each installment, along with female ninja Mai Shiranui. Some characters made appearances outside the series, particularly in The King of Fighters series and in Art of Fighting 2 (where a young Geese Howard appears as a hidden opponent). Likewise, characters from outside the series have appeared in the Fatal Fury games. Ryo Sakazaki from the Art of Fighting series makes an appearance in a hidden "dream match" in Fatal Fury Special, while his older self from Buriki One appears in Fatal Fury: Wild Ambition. Garou: Mark of the Wolves is the only Fatal Fury game not to feature any returning character with the exception of Terry Bogard himself, who was completely redesigned for the game.

Story 
The Fatal Fury series chronicles the rise of "Lone Wolf" Terry Bogard (hence the Japanese title, which translates to Legend of the Hungry Wolf), and the simultaneous fall of the criminal empire of Geese Howard. Like many other SNK titles of the time, the first installment takes place in a fictitious American city called South Town. Brimming with violence and corruption, South Town forms the ideal backdrop for the annual The King of Fighters fighting tournament, organized by notorious crime lord Geese Howard. No fighter has ever managed to beat his right-hand man and appointed champion, Billy Kane, until Terry arrives.

The second installment of the series features Geese's half-brother, Wolfgang Krauser, who internationalizes the formerly local tournament in a bid to take on the world's strongest combatants. The tournament disappears from the storyline by the third game, having spun off into its own series. Instead, the third installment centers around Terry Bogard's attempts to stop Geese from obtaining an ancient scroll that would give him the powers of a lost and dangerous martial art form.

After the third game, the series was renamed to Real Bout Fatal Fury. In its first installment, the final and decisive battle is set between Terry and Geese. The King of Fighters tournament appears in this game. The second installment, which is named Real Bout Fatal Fury Special, features Wolfgang's return.

Garou: Mark of the Wolves takes place a generation later. It focuses on Rock Howard, Terry's protégé and son of Geese, who makes a shocking discovery about his past when he enters the tournament.

Development 

Series producers Takashi Nishiyama (Fatal Fury~Real Bout Fatal Fury 2) and Hiroshi Matsumoto (since Fatal Fury 3), were the planners of the original Street Fighter (where they were credited as Piston Takashi and Finish Hiroshi). Matsumoto is also the creator of the Art of Fighting series.

In other media 
The Fatal Fury series inspired a trilogy of animated productions produced by NAS with SNK, featuring character designs by Masami Ōbari. The first is a television special that aired in 1992 on Fuji TV titled Fatal Fury: Legend of the Hungry Wolf (Battle Fighters Garou Densetsu), which adapts the plot of the first game. It was followed in 1993 by another television special Fatal Fury 2: The New Battle (Battle Fighters Garou Densetsu 2) based on the second game, which also aired on Fuji TV. A theatrically released film followed in 1994, titled Fatal Fury: The Motion Picture (Garou Densetsu: The Motion Picture), which features an original plot and new characters. The first two TV specials were released on a single laserdisc and later on DVD.

VIZ Communications picked up the license for the trilogy and produced English dubbed versions of each of them, releasing them straight to VHS, and later on DVD. They were later released subtitled, with the first two Fatal Fury specials released in one video titled Fatal Fury One-Two Punch. The subbed version of Fatal Fury 2 features a scene involving a rematch between Joe Higashi and Big Bear (Raiden) that was cut from the dubbed version. The English DVD release of the TV specials, Fatal Fury: Double Impact, features this scene. If chosen to be viewed with the English dub, it would temporarily go onto Japanese with English subtitles during this scene.

Many soundtracks, manga comics, other books, video tapes, and drama CDs have been released in Japan for the series as a whole and for each of its individual entries.

The fan film Fatal Fury: Mark of the Wolves was released on YouTube on February 10, 2021 starring Josh Mabie as Rock Howard (also as the director and of action design) and Christian Howard as Terry Bogard (also as the producer); these two also served as the writers and for co-fight choreography.

Characters from Fatal Fury have gone on to make guest appearances in other fighting games such as Dead or Alive 5: Last Round, Tekken 7, Fighting EX Layer and Super Smash Bros. Ultimate.

References

External links 

 
 
 Garou Densetsu Battle Archive 1 at SNK Playmore
 Garou Densetsu Battle Archive 2 at SNK Playmore
 Garou Densetsu series at NBC Museum of SNK Playmore

 
Video games about ninja
SNK franchises
SNK games
Fighting video games by series
SNK Playmore games
Takara video games
Fighting games
Video game franchises introduced in 1991
Video games set in Hong Kong
Muay Thai video games
Video games developed in Japan